Dhunn is an Indian music band of soft rock – contemporary genre and comprises Ankur Bhasin and Muneer A. Mohsin. Dhunn is known for their original, melodious music and live instrumentation in their music. Being a young and emerging group, Dhunn is a major hit with the late teens and early adults. Dhunn write and compose all their own music.

Members
Ankur Bhasin
Muneer A Mohsin

Early Years

Ankur and Muneer both studied in Bishop Cotton Boys' School, Bangalore, India. During their schooling days, Ankur started writing poetry and his interest in music led to participation in a literary fest organised by Baldwin Boys' School in 1997. Ankur's group won third prize in the Western Music (Group) category. With an enthused interest, as an aftermath of the unanticipated win in the literary fest, Ankur decided to learn guitar. Ankur met with his school mate Muneer who was also struggling to learn guitar. Together they started learning and teaching guitar to each other.

Being largely self-taught and without the knowledge of written music, the duo created their own format of notations and chords and started creating their own music. However, after the completion of their high school in 2000, Ankur moved to Carnegie Mellon University, US for further studies. Muneer also subsequently moved to Michigan State University, USA for pursuing his college.

In USA, Ankur served as the President of Awaaz (a student organisation for Indian Music at Carnegie Mellon University) during the year 2002–2003 and also formed a fusion band Raag 'n Roll. The band was an instant hit amongst the students, having gathered more than 350 people for its first performance in Pittsburgh, USA. The band was however disbanded the next year with many of its members leaving the university upon completion of their courses at Carnegie Mellon University.

Music career 

After the completion of their college in 2004, the duo met up again in Bangalore. Rekindling their interest in music, Ankur and Muneer started creating their own music. Ankur soon met with another friend from school – Rahul Gupta. Due to their shared interest in original music, Ankur invited Rahul to be part of the band (then known as Dreamers). Dreamers changed their name to Vibrants and recorded their debut album at Raveolution Studios, Bangalore.

The band once again changed their name to Dhunn and launched their debut video, Yaadein, at Cinemax, Versova, Mumbai on 11 April 2007. Rahul, however, soon separated from the band thereafter. The label Dhunn signed to was unable to deliver and release the music and Dhunn subsequently cancelled the agreement with the label.

Dhunn released their second video, Tumhari Yaad in 2008 at Lido Mall, Bengaluru.

Dhunn actively performed in Bengaluru, Mumbai and Vietnam for 2 years after which the band went on a hiatus.

On May 10, 2000, Dhunn finally launched their music online through Encore Films.

Album discography

Video Discography

Performances

TV appearances

Radio Appearances

Magazine appearances

Trivia
Dhunn's debut video 'Yaadein' is ranked No. 13 in the All Time Non Movie Hits category by Rajshri

References

References

External links
[ Allmusic.com]

Indian rock music groups
Musical groups established in 2007